Yasmin Said  is a Kenyan actress who received an award for Best Lead Actress in TV Drama at the Kalasha Awards in 2020. Said was born on 7 October 2000 and raised in Nairobi. Until 2021, she was a brand ambassador for Indomie.

Awards & nominations 
Said won an award for the Best Lead Actress in TV Drama at Kalasha Awards in 2020 for the series Maria on Citizen Tv.

|-
! scope="row" | 2020
| Kalasha Film & TV Awards
| Best Lead Actress in TV Drama
| Yasmin Said
| 
|

Filmography

References 

Kenyan television actresses
Living people
2000 births